The 1971–72 Phoenix Suns season was the fourth season for the Phoenix Suns of the National Basketball Association. With a 49–33 record, the Suns hold the NBA record as the team with the best winning percentage to not make the playoffs. The team broke the record they set the previous year with a 48–34 finish. Head coach Cotton Fitzsimmons led the Suns in their debut season as members of the Pacific division. All home games were played at Arizona Veterans Memorial Coliseum.

Paul Silas again led the team in rebounds, averaging 11.9 per game, while also leading the Suns in assists with a 4.3 average. Connie Hawkins's 21 points a game led the club, while Dick Van Arsdale was second with his 19.7 average. Silas averaged 17.5 for the season, while both Clem Haskins and Neal Walk averaged 15.7.

Draft picks

Roster
{| class="toccolours" style="font-size: 85%; width: 100%;"
|-
! colspan="2" style="background-color: #423189;  color: #FF8800; text-align: center;" | Phoenix Suns roster
|- style="background-color: #FF8800; color: #423189;   text-align: center;"
! Players !! Coaches
|-
| valign="top" |
{| class="sortable" style="background:transparent; margin:0px; width:100%;"
! Pos. !! # !! Nat. !! Name !! Height !! Weight !! DOB (Y-M-D) !! From
|-

Regular season

Standings

Record vs. opponents

Game log

!!Streak
|-
|- align="center" bgcolor="#ffcccc"
| 1
| October 14
| Milwaukee
| L 97–110
| Connie Hawkins (25)
| Arizona Veterans Memorial Coliseum9,174
| 0–1
| L 1
|- align="center" bgcolor="#ccffcc"
| 2
| October 16
| Houston
| W 128–108
| Paul Silas (26)
| Arizona Veterans Memorial Coliseum8,572
| 1–1
| W 1
|- align="center" bgcolor="#ffcccc"
| 3
| October 22
| Detroit
| L 109–116
| Connie Hawkins (25)
| Arizona Veterans Memorial Coliseum7,337
| 1–2
| L 1
|- align="center" bgcolor="#ffcccc"
| 4
| October 24
| Chicago
| L 104–105
| Paul Silas (21)
| Arizona Veterans Memorial Coliseum6,970
| 1–3
| L 2
|- align="center" bgcolor="#ccffcc"
| 5
| October 26
| Cincinnati
| W 126–99
| Paul Silas (26)
| Arizona Veterans Memorial Coliseum6,901
| 2–3
| W 1
|- align="center" bgcolor="#ccffcc"
| 6
| October 29
| @ Philadelphia
| W 137–135 (2OT)
| Dick Van Arsdale (28)
| The Spectrum6,128
| 3–3
| W 2
|- align="center" bgcolor="#ffcccc"
| 7
| October 30
| @ Baltimore
| L 94–101
| Dick Van Arsdale (29)
| Baltimore Civic Center6,839
| 3–4
| L 1
|-
!!Streak
|-
|- align="center" bgcolor="#ffcccc"
| 8
| November 2
| @ Chicago
| L 101–108
| Clem Haskins (22)
| Chicago Stadium5,843
| 3–5
| L 2
|- align="center" bgcolor="#ccffcc"
| 9
| November 3
| @ Buffalo
| W 100–98
| Dick Van Arsdale (31)
| Buffalo Memorial Auditorium5,417
| 4–5
| W 1
|- align="center" bgcolor="#ccffcc"
| 10
| November 5
| @ Cleveland
| W 107–87
| Clem Haskins (24)
| Cleveland Arena3,307
| 5–5
| W 2
|- align="center" bgcolor="#ffcccc"
| 11
| November 6
| @ Cincinnati
| L 95–110
| Clem Haskins (22)
| Cincinnati Gardens3,076
| 5–6
| L 1
|- align="center" bgcolor="#ffcccc"
| 12
| November 9
| @ Milwaukee
| L 113–118
| Connie Hawkins (28)
| Milwaukee Arena10,039
| 5–7
| L 2
|- align="center" bgcolor="#ccffcc"
| 13
| November 12
| Boston
| W 128–119
| Connie Hawkins (33)
| Arizona Veterans Memorial Coliseum9,470
| 6–7
| W 1
|- align="center" bgcolor="#ccffcc"
| 14
| November 14
| Cleveland
| W 119–105
| Dick Van Arsdale (21)
| Arizona Veterans Memorial Coliseum5,336
| 7–7
| W 2
|- align="center" bgcolor="#ffcccc"
| 15
| November 16
| @ New York
| L 111–112
| Dick Van Arsdale (26)
| Madison Square Garden18,344
| 7–8
| L 1
|- align="center" bgcolor="#ffcccc"
| 16
| November 17
| @ Boston
| L 121–140
| Connie Hawkins (35)
| Boston Garden9,440
| 7–9
| L 2
|- align="center" bgcolor="#ffcccc"
| 17
| November 18
| @ Detroit
| L 126–128
| Neal Walk (30)
| Cobo Arena3,418
| 7–10
| L 3
|- align="center" bgcolor="#ffcccc"
| 18
| November 20
| @ Atlanta
| L 109–115
| Paul Silas (24)
| Alexander Memorial Coliseum5,702
| 7–11
| L 4
|- align="center" bgcolor="#ccffccc"
| 19
| November 23
| Philadelphia
| W 128–107
| Mo Layton (27)
| Arizona Veterans Memorial Coliseum6,678
| 8–11
| W 1
|- align="center" bgcolor="#ccffcc"
| 20
| November 25
| Detroit
| W 122–103
| Mo Layton (21)
| Arizona Veterans Memorial Coliseum7,846
| 9–11
| W 2
|- align="center" bgcolor="#ccffcc"
| 21
| November 28
| @ Houston
| W 116–110
| Mo Layton (25)
| Hofheinz Pavilion3,643
| 10–11
| W 3
|- align="center" bgcolor="#ccffcc"
| 22
| November 30
| @ Portland
| W 121–111 (OT)
| Dick Van Arsdale (23)
| Memorial Coliseum7,704
| 11–11
| W 4
|-
!!Streak
|-
|- align="center" bgcolor="#ccffcc"
| 23
| December 1
| Portland
| W 139–103
| Paul Silas (25)
| Arizona Veterans Memorial Coliseum6,040
| 12–11
| W 5
|- align="center" bgcolor="#ccffcc"
| 24
| December 4
| @ Golden State
| W 128–92
| Clem Haskins (27)
| Oakland–Alameda County Coliseum Arena5,491
| 13–11
| W 6
|- align="center" bgcolor="#ccffcc"
| 25
| December 5
| Golden State
| W 120–87
| Connie Hawkins (21)
| Arizona Veterans Memorial Coliseum6,886
| 14–11
| W 7
|- align="center" bgcolor="#ccffcc"
| 26
| December 9
| Atlanta
| W 135–115
| Connie Hawkins (30)
| Arizona Veterans Memorial Coliseum7,524
| 15–11
| W 8
|- align="center" bgcolor="#ffcccc"
| 27
| December 10
| @ Los Angeles
| L 117–126 (OT)
| Dick Van Arsdale (31)
| The Forum17,505
| 15–12
| L 1
|- align="center" bgcolor="#ffcccc"
| 28
| December 11
| Houston
| L 110–111
| Hawkins, Silas (23)
| Arizona Veterans Memorial Coliseum7,695
| 15–13
| L 2
|- align="center" bgcolor="#ccffcc"
| 29
| December 14
| @ New York
| W 110–100
| Neal Walk (24)
| Madison Square Garden19,253
| 16–13
| W 1
|- align="center" bgcolor="#ccffcc"
| 30
| December 15
| @ Cincinnati
| W 127–108
| Dick Van Arsdale (31)
| Cincinnati Gardens2,038
| 17–13
| W 2
|- align="center" bgcolor="#ccffcc"
| 31
| December 17
| Detroit
| W 123–102
| Dick Van Arsdale (26)
| Arizona Veterans Memorial Coliseum7,808
| 18–13
| W 3
|- align="center" bgcolor="#ffcccc"
| 32
| December 18
| Los Angeles
| L 106–132
| Neal Walk (31)
| Arizona Veterans Memorial Coliseum12,534
| 18–14
| L 1
|- align="center" bgcolor="#ffcccc"
| 33
| December 19
| @ Seattle
| L 127–130 (OT)
| Paul Silas (29)
| Seattle Center Coliseum9,189
| 18–15
| L 2
|- align="center" bgcolor="#ccffcc"
| 34
| December 21
| Philadelphia
| W 124–119
| Paul Silas (29)
| Arizona Veterans Memorial Coliseum6,272
| 19–15
| W 1
|- align="center" bgcolor="#ffcccc"
| 35
| December 23
| Chicago
| L 108–117 (OT)
| Dick Van Arsdale (28)
| Arizona Veterans Memorial Coliseum9,289
| 19–16
| L 1
|- align="center" bgcolor="#ccffcc"
| 36
| December 25
| Seattle
| W 116–86
| Connie Hawkins (31)
| Arizona Veterans Memorial Coliseum7,026
| 20–16
| W 1
|- align="center" bgcolor="#ccffcc"
| 37
| December 29
| @ Houston
| W 124–106
| Clem Haskins,Dick Van Arsdale (27)
| Hofheinz Pavilion5,389
| 21–16
| W 2
|- align="center" bgcolor="#ccffcc"
| 38
| December 30
| Buffalo
| W 123–102
| Mel Counts,Paul Silas,Dick Van Arsdale (19)
| Arizona Veterans Memorial Coliseum7,272
| 22–16
| W 3
|-
!!Streak
|-
|- align="center" bgcolor="#ccffcc"
| 39
| January 1
| Boston
| W 114–104
| Connie Hawkins (25)
| Arizona Veterans Memorial Coliseum8,056
| 23–16
| W 4
|- align="center" bgcolor="#ffcccc"
| 40
| January 2
| Atlanta
| L 111–116
| Clem Haskins (29)
| Arizona Veterans Memorial Coliseum6,670
| 23–17
| L 1
|- align="center" bgcolor="#ccffcc"
| 41
| January 4
| @ Chicago
| W 112–108
| Clem Haskins (23)
| Chicago Stadium9,009
| 24–17
| W 1
|- align="center" bgcolor="#ccffcc"
| 42
| January 7
| @ Buffalo
| W 123–110
| Connie Hawkins (32)
| Buffalo Memorial Auditorium10,247
| 25–17
| W 2
|- align="center" bgcolor="#ffcccc"
| 43
| January 8
| @ Philadelphia
| L 119–130
| Otto Moore (21)
| The Spectrum7,833
| 25–18
| L 1
|- align="center" bgcolor="#ffcccc"
| 44
| January 9
| @ Baltimore
| L 103–109
| Connie Hawkins,Dick Van Arsdale (22)
| College Park, MD7,235
| 25–19
| L 2
|- align="center" bgcolor="#ccffcc"
| 45
| January 11
| @ Milwaukee
| W 115–114
| Neal Walk (42)
| Milwaukee Arena10,111
| 26–19
| W 1
|- align="center" bgcolor="#ccffcc"
| 46
| January 14
| Cleveland
| W 117–107
| Neal Walk (24)
| Arizona Veterans Memorial Coliseum8,279
| 27–19
| W 2
|- align="center" bgcolor="#ffcccc"
| 47
| January 15
| @ Seattle
| L 110–118
| Mel Counts,Paul Silas,Dick Van Arsdale (18)
| Seattle Center Coliseum12,693
| 27–20
| L 1
|- align="center" bgcolor="#ffcccc"
| 48
| January 16
| Baltimore
| L 104–107
| Dick Van Arsdale (25)
| Arizona Veterans Memorial Coliseum6,385
| 27–21
| L 2
|- align="center"
|colspan="9" bgcolor="#bbcaff"|All-Star Break
|- align="center" bgcolor="#ccffcc"
| 49
| January 20
| New York
| W 130–109
| Connie Hawkins (40)
| Arizona Veterans Memorial Coliseum8,006
| 28–21
| W 1
|- align="center" bgcolor="#ccffcc"
| 50
| January 21
| @ Seattle
| W 128–113
| Connie Hawkins (29)
| Seattle Center Coliseum12,751
| 29–21
| W 2
|- align="center" bgcolor="#ccffcc"
| 51
| January 22
| Los Angeles
| W 116–102
| Dick Van Arsdale (32)
| Arizona Veterans Memorial Coliseum12,534
| 30–21
| W 3
|- align="center" bgcolor="#ffcccc"
| 52
| January 25
| @ Los Angeles
| L 119–129
| Paul Silas (24)
| The Forum17,505
| 30–22
| L 1
|- align="center" bgcolor="#ffcccc"
| 53
| January 28
| Chicago
| L 102–116
| Paul Silas (29)
| Arizona Veterans Memorial Coliseum9,245
| 30–23
| L 2
|- align="center" bgcolor="#ffcccc"
| 54
| January 29
| @ Golden State
| L 110–111
| Paul Silas (28)
| Oakland–Alameda County Coliseum Arena6,488
| 30–24
| L 3
|- align="center" bgcolor="#ccffcc"
| 55
| January 30
| Atlanta
| W 105–103
| Clem Haskins,Connie Hawkins,Neal Walk (21)
| Arizona Veterans Memorial Coliseum8,839
| 31–24
| W 1
|-
!!Streak
|-
|- align="center" bgcolor="#ccffcc"
| 56
| February 1
| @ Portland
| W 129–117
| Dick Van Arsdale (24)
| Memorial Coliseum4,961
| 32–24
| W 2
|- align="center" bgcolor="#ffcccc"
| 57
| February 2
| Milwaukee
| L 103–106
| Connie Hawkins (37)
| Arizona Veterans Memorial Coliseum9,365
| 32–25
| L 1
|- align="center" bgcolor="#ccffcc"
| 58
| February 4
| Golden State
| W 113–105
| Dick Van Arsdale (27)
| Arizona Veterans Memorial Coliseum8,486
| 33–25
| W 1
|- align="center" bgcolor="#ccffcc"
| 59
| February 5
| @ Portland
| W 118–117 (OT)
| Dick Van Arsdale (28)
| Memorial Coliseum6,401
| 34–25
| W 2
|- align="center" bgcolor="#ccffcc"
| 60
| February 6
| Portland
| W 107–94
| Paul Silas (26)
| Arizona Veterans Memorial Coliseum6,160
| 35–25
| W 3
|- align="center" bgcolor="#ccffcc"
| 61
| February 8
| Philadelphia
| W 120–108
| Connie Hawkins (26)
| Arizona Veterans Memorial Coliseum6,532
| 36–25
| W 4
|- align="center" bgcolor="#ccffcc"
| 62
| February 10
| Baltimore
| W 131–98
| Dick Van Arsdale (27)
| Arizona Veterans Memorial Coliseum6,794
| 37–25
| W 5
|- align="center" bgcolor="#ccffcc"
| 63
| February 12
| Cincinnati
| W 117–95
| Dick Van Arsdale (31)
| Arizona Veterans Memorial Coliseum10,766
| 38–25
| W 6
|- align="center" bgcolor="#ccffcc"
| 64
| February 16
| Los Angeles
| W 110–109
| Neal Walk (30)
| Arizona Veterans Memorial Coliseum12,534
| 39–25
| W 7
|- align="center" bgcolor="#ccffcc"
| 65
| February 18
| Boston
| W 126–115
| Dick Van Arsdale (32)
| Arizona Veterans Memorial Coliseum12,005
| 40–25
| W 8
|- align="center" bgcolor="#ccffcc"
| 66
| February 20
| @ Detroit
| W 121–107
| Dick Van Arsdale (25)
| Cobo Arena4,898
| 41–25
| W 9
|- align="center" bgcolor="#ffcccc"
| 67
| February 22
| @ Boston
| L 103–114
| Connie Hawkins (30)
| Boston Garden8,106
| 41–26
| L 1
|- align="center" bgcolor="#ffcccc"
| 68
| February 23
| @ Atlanta
| L 118–120
| Paul Silas (26)
| Alexander Memorial Coliseum5,073
| 41–27
| L 2
|- align="center" bgcolor="#ffcccc"
| 69
| February 25
| @ Chicago
| L 107–115
| Connie Hawkins (25)
| Chicago Stadium9,720
| 41–28
| L 3
|- align="center" bgcolor="#ffcccc"
| 70
| February 26
| @ Milwaukee
| L 117–119 (OT)
| Neal Walk (28)
| Madison, WI9,371
| 41–29
| L 4
|- align="center" bgcolor="#ccffcc"
| 71
| February 27
| @ Cleveland
| W 127–125
| Mo Layton (37)
| Cleveland Arena6,889
| 42–29
| W 1
|-
!!Streak
|-
|- align="center" bgcolor="#ffcccc"
| 72
| March 1
| Baltimore
| L 90–95
| Paul Silas (16)
| Arizona Veterans Memorial Coliseum9,002
| 42–30
| L 1
|- align="center" bgcolor="#ccffcc"
| 73
| March 5
| Buffalo
| W 131–103
| Neal Walk (26)
| Arizona Veterans Memorial Coliseum6,729
| 43–30
| W 1
|- align="center" bgcolor="#ccffcc"
| 74
| March 7
| @ Detroit
| W 129–121
| Connie Hawkins (28)
| Cobo Arena2,014
| 44–30
| W 2
|- align="center" bgcolor="#ffcccc"
| 75
| March 8
| @ Cincinnati
| L 105–122
| Neal Walk (18)
| Cincinnati Gardens2,387
| 44–31
| L 1
|- align="center" bgcolor="#ccffcc"
| 76
| March 11
| @ New York
| W 110–106
| Dick Van Arsdale (25)
| Madison Square Garden19,588
| 45–31
| W 1
|- align="center" bgcolor="#ccffcc"
| 77
| March 15
| Milwaukee
| W 110–106
| Connie Hawkins (27)
| Arizona Veterans Memorial Coliseum11,090
| 46–31
| W 2
|- align="center" bgcolor="#ccffcc"
| 78
| March 17
| New York
| W 111–106
| Charlie Scott (23)
| Arizona Veterans Memorial Coliseum10,571
| 47–31
| W 3
|- align="center" bgcolor="#ffcccc"
| 79
| March 18
| @ Golden State
| L 116–134
| Connie Hawkins (25)
| Oakland–Alameda County Coliseum Arena9,399
| 47–32
| L 1
|- align="center" bgcolor="#ccffcc"
| 80
| March 21
| Portland
| W 160–128
| Clem Haskins (28)
| Arizona Veterans Memorial Coliseum8,045
| 48–32
| W 1
|- align="center" bgcolor="#ffcccc"
| 81
| March 24
| @ Los Angeles
| L 110–112
| Charlie Scott (21)
| The Forum17,505
| 48–33
| L 1
|- align="center" bgcolor="#ccffcc"
| 82
| March 25
| Seattle
| W 118–99
| Charlie Scott (21)
| Arizona Veterans Memorial Coliseum10,189
| 49–33
| W 1
|-

Team-by-team results

Awards and honors

All-Star
 Connie Hawkins was selected as a reserve for the Western Conference in the All-Star Game. It was his third consecutive All-Star selection.
 Paul Silas was selected as a reserve for the Western Conference in the All-Star Game. It was his first All-Star selection.

Season
 Paul Silas was named to the NBA All-Defensive Second Team.

Player statistics

Season

* – Stats with the Suns.
^ – Minimum 350 free throw attempts.

Transactions

Trades

Free agents

Additions

Subtractions

References
 Standings on Basketball Reference

Phoenix
Phoenix Suns seasons